Vigiland is a Swedish house duo consisting of Claes Remmered Persson and Otto Pettersson from the Swedish community Västervik, Sweden. Their first single "Bouncer" became popular on Spotify when it was released in late 2013. Upon releasing their Melbourne Bounce-influenced single "UFO", it made the top 10 of Spotify's most played songs. With the release of their single "Shots & Squats", Vigiland achieved number-ones in Scandinavia over summer and autumn 2015. "Shots & Squats" also became popular in Latin America due to Vine and after it was used as the theme for the MTV series SuperShore. In 2016, Vigiland released "Pong Dance", which reached number 2 in Sweden.

Discography

Singles

Notes

References

External links
Official website

Swedish DJs
Swedish record producers
Electronic dance music DJs